This list contains all cultural property of regional significance (class B) in the canton of Vaud from the 2009 Swiss Inventory of Cultural Property of National and Regional Significance. It is sorted by municipality.

The geographic coordinates provided are in the Swiss coordinate system as given in the Inventory.

Agiez

Aigle

Allaman

Assens

Aubonne

Avenches

Ballaigues

Bassins

Baulmes

Bavois

Begnins

Bercher

Bettens

Bex

Bonvillars

Bottens

Bournens

Bursinel

Bursins

Chardonne

Cheseaux-sur-Lausanne

Chevilly

Chexbres

Coinsins

Commugny

Concise

Coppet

Corseaux

Cossonay

Cuarnens

Cudrefin

Curtilles

Daillens

Denens

Donneloye

Échallens

Echandens

Epalinges

Faoug

Genolier

Giez

Gilly

Gingins

Gland

Grancy

Grandson

Gryon

Jouxtens-Mézery

La Rippe

La Sarraz

La Tour-de-Peilz

Lausanne

Leysin

Lonay

Lucens

Lutry

Mathod

Mont-sur-Rolle

Montherod

Montreux

Montricher

Morrens

Penthaz

Pully

Prilly

Puidoux

Pully

Rennaz

Rolle

Ropraz

Rougemont

Rovray

Sainte-Croix

Saint-Prex

Saint-Saphorin

Senarclens

Sullens

Trelex

Treytorrens

Valeyres-sous-Rances

Vallorbe

Vevey

Veytaux

Villarzel

Vinzel

Vuarrens

Vufflens-la-Ville

Yverdon-les-Bains

See also 
 Swiss Inventory of Cultural Property of National and Regional Significance, 2009 edition:
PDF documents: Class A objects
PDF documents: Class B objects
List of cultural property of national significance in Switzerland: Vaud

Canton of Vaud
 01
Buildings and structures in the canton of Vaud
Tourist attractions in the canton of Vaud